Sam Oliver Slocombe (born 5 June 1988) is an English professional footballer who plays as a goalkeeper for Notts County. He began his career with Bottesford Town in the Northern Counties East Football League. In 2008, he moved to his hometown club Scunthorpe United. Slocombe had made over 130 appearances for Scunthorpe and was the club's longest-serving player, before being released by them in 2015.

Career

Scunthorpe United
Slocombe was born in Scunthorpe, Lincolnshire. On 15 August 2008, he signed with League One side Scunthorpe United from Bottesford Town for £3,000 and a pre-season friendly. He made his first team debut on 22 September 2009, in a League Cup clash with Port Vale, replacing Joe Murphy, following a 25th minute injury to Murphy. He made his league debut in the Championship match against Blackpool on 7 November 2009, replacing Michael O'Connor after Murphy was sent off for deliberate handball. On 5 May 2015 it was announced that Slocombe wouldn't be offered a new deal and was free to leave the club.

Oxford United
Slocombe signed for Oxford United, then in League Two, on a two-year contract on 12 June 2015.

Blackpool
On 19 July 2016, shortly after leaving Oxford United by mutual consent, Slocombe signed a one-year deal with League Two club Blackpool. His contract has an option of a further twelve months.

Bristol Rovers
On 6 July 2017, after being released by Blackpool, Slocombe signed for Bristol Rovers on a free transfer. He was one of two keepers signed by Rovers on this day, with Adam Smith joining him. He made his debut in Rovers' third game of the season, a 3–2 victory away at Bury. On 21 August 2018, Slocombe joined League Two side Lincoln City on an initial seven-day emergency loan deal. His loan spell was terminated with Lincoln on 9 January 2019. Slocombe was one of 9 players who departed the club at the end of their contract at the end of the 2018–19 season.

Notts County
On 1 August 2019, Slocombe signed for National League side Notts County.

Career statistics

Honours
Scunthorpe United
Football League Two runner-up: 2013–14

Blackpool
EFL League Two play-offs: 2017

References

External links

1988 births
Living people
Sportspeople from Scunthorpe
English footballers
Association football goalkeepers
Bottesford Town F.C. players
Scunthorpe United F.C. players
Oxford United F.C. players
Blackpool F.C. players
Bristol Rovers F.C. players
Lincoln City F.C. players
Notts County F.C. players
Northern Counties East Football League players
English Football League players
National League (English football) players